Goon Nure is a locality in the East Gippsland region of Victoria, Australia.

References

External links

Towns in Victoria (Australia)
Shire of East Gippsland